Manipal-Tata Medical College, Jamshedpur, established in 2020, is a private medical college located in Jamshedpur, Jharkhand. It is one of the first medical colleges in private-private partnerships in India. This college offers the Bachelor of Medicine and Surgery (MBBS) courses and has an annual intake capacity of 150. This college is affiliated with the Manipal Academy of Higher Education and recognized by the National Medical Commission.

See also

References

Medical colleges in Jharkhand

Hospitals in Jharkhand
Hospitals in Jamshedpur